

<div id="31_January_2008"> </div id>

31 January 2008 (Thursday)
 Association football: 2008 Africa Cup of Nations:
Last day of the group stages.
Group D:  1 – 1 
Group D:  0 – 0 
Two drawn matches see Angola and Tunisia through to the quarter-finals.
Basketball: Euroleague
The final berth in the Top 16 phase is secured by  Partizan Belgrade when they defeat already-qualified  Fenerbahçe 91–86 in Istanbul in Group C action. (Euroleague)

<div id="30_January_2008"> </div id>

30 January 2008 (Wednesday)
 Association football: 2008 Africa Cup of Nations:
Group C:  3 – 0 
Group C:  1 – 1 
Samuel Eto'o of Cameroon becomes the top-scoring player in Africa Cup of Nations history with his 15th goal, his penalty being the opening goal against Sudan. (BBC)
U.S. college:
In one of the biggest upsets of the year thus far, the Kansas State Wildcats defeated the previously undefeated #2 Kansas Jayhawks, 84–75 behind 20-point games from three different freshmen, including K-State star Michael Beasley who finished with 25 points (9-for-18 from the field). The win ends a 24-year streak of the Jayhawks winning at the Bramlage Coliseum, the Wildcats' home court. It also leaves Memphis as the lone unbeaten Division I team.
<div id="29_January_2008"> </div id>

29 January 2008 (Tuesday)
 Association football: 2008 Africa Cup of Nations:
Group B:  2 – 0 
Group B:  3 – 0 
Nigeria finally manage to win a match, and leap-frog past Mali into the quarter finals with Côte d'Ivoire, thereby saving coach Berti Vogts' job.

<div id="28_January_2008"> </div id>

28 January 2008 (Monday)
 Association football: 2008 Africa Cup of Nations:
Group A:   2–0  
Group A:   1–1  
Cricket:
Indian cricket team in Australia in 2007–08
4th Test:  526 (152.5 ov.) & 269/7 dec. (90 ov.) drew with  563 (181 ov.)

<div id="27_January_2008"> </div id>

27 January 2008 (Sunday)
 Association football: 2008 Africa Cup of Nations:
Group D:  1 – 3 
Group D:  3 – 1 
Auto racing:
Rolex Sports Car season: 24 Hours of Daytona, at Daytona International Speedway, Florida, USA:
(1) Juan Pablo Montoya , Dario Franchitti , Scott Pruett  and Memo Rojas  (2) Jon Fogarty , Alex Gurney , Jimmie Johnson  and Jimmy Vasser  (3) Ryan Briscoe , Kurt Busch  and Hélio Castroneves 
2008 World Rally Championship: Rallye Automobile de Monte-Carlo, at Monaco:
(1) Sébastien Loeb  (2) Mikko Hirvonen  (3) Chris Atkinson 
Cycling: UCI ProTour – Tour Down Under
1:  André Greipel 2:  Allan Davis 3:  José Joaquín Rojas Gil
Cyclo-cross: UCI Cyclo-cross World Championships:
Men:   Lars Boom,   Zdeněk Štybar,   Sven Nys
Women:   Hanka Kupfernagel,   Marianne Vos,   Laurence Leboucher
Cricket:
Zimbabwean cricket team in Pakistan in 2007–08
3rd ODI- 272/9 (50 overs) beat  235/7 (50 overs) by 37 runs
West Indian cricket team in South Africa in 2007–08
3rd ODI- 256/3 (50 overs) beat  252/7 (48.4 overs) by 7 wickets
Golf:
Tiger Woods wins the Buick Invitational in San Diego by eight strokes. The win is Woods' 62nd on the PGA Tour, matching Arnold Palmer for fourth on the list for most PGA Tour wins.
Ice hockey:
NHL All-Star Game at Atlanta:
East 8–7 West, Eric Staal of the Carolina Hurricanes was named All-Star MVP.
Tennis: 2008 Australian Open
Men's singles – Finals
 Novak Djokovic [3] def.  Jo-Wilfried Tsonga, 4–6, 6–4, 6–3, 7–62

<div id="26_January_2008"> </div id>

26 January 2008 (Saturday)
 Association football: 2008 Africa Cup of Nations:
Group C:  5 – 1 
Group C:  3 – 0 
Tennis: 2008 Australian Open
Women's singles – Finals
 Maria Sharapova [5] def.  Ana Ivanovic [4], 7–5, 6–3

<div id="25_January_2008"> </div id>

25 January 2008 (Friday)
 Association football: 2008 Africa Cup of Nations:
Group B:  4 – 1 
Group B:  0 – 0 
Tennis: 2008 Australian Open
Men's singles – semi-finals
 Novak Djokovic [3] def.  Roger Federer [1], 7–5, 6–3, 7–65

<div id="24_January_2008"> </div id>

24 January 2008 (Thursday)
 Association football: 2008 Africa Cup of Nations:
Group A:  3 – 2 
Group A:  1 – 0 
Tennis: 2008 Australian Open
Men's singles – semi-finals
 Jo-Wilfried Tsonga def.  Rafael Nadal [2], 6–2, 6–3, 6–2
Women's singles – semi-finals
 Ana Ivanovic [4] def.  Daniela Hantuchová [9], 0–6, 6–3, 6–4
 Maria Sharpova [5] def.  Jelena Janković [3], 6–3, 6–1

<div id="23_January_2008"> </div id>

23 January 2008 (Wednesday)
 Association football: 2008 Africa Cup of Nations:
Group D:  2 – 2 
Group D:  1 – 1 
Basketball:
Euroleague
Two clubs (in bold) secure spots in the Top 16 phase:
In Group C,  Lottomatica Roma defeat already-qualified  FC Barcelona 77–75 in Barcelona. This result, combined with the 100–87 home win of previously winless  Le Mans over  Cibona in Group B, also sends idle  Fenerbahçe through from Group C. (Euroleague)
U.S. college:
Sporting their first Top 25 ranking since 1969 (AP #25), Baylor defeats (#18) Texas A&M, 116–110 in the longest game in Big 12 history, going five overtimes. The Bears' Curtis Jerrells had 36 points in the win. Five Baylor players fouled out, while three Aggies played over 55 minutes, also a record.
Tennis: 2008 Australian Open
Men's singles – quarter-finals
 Roger Federer [1] def.  James Blake [12], 7–5, 7–65, 6–4
 Novak Djokovic [3] def.  David Ferrer [5], 6–0, 6–3, 7–5
Women's singles – quarter-finals
 Ana Ivanovic [4] def.  Venus Williams [8], 7–63, 6–4
 Daniela Hantuchová [9] def.  Agnieszka Radwańska [29], 6–2, 6–2

<div id="22_January_2008"> </div id>

22 January 2008 (Tuesday)
 Association football: 2008 Africa Cup of Nations:
Group C:  4 – 2 
Group C:  0 – 3 
 Tennis: 2008 Australian Open
Men's singles – quarter-finals
 Jo-Wilfried Tsonga def.  Mikhail Youzhny [14], 7–5, 6–0, 7–66
 Rafael Nadal [2] def.  Jarkko Nieminen [24], 7–5, 6–3, 6–1
Women's singles – quarter-finals
 Maria Sharapova [5] def.  Justine Henin [1], 6–4, 6–0
 Jelena Janković [3] def.  Serena Williams [7], 6–3, 6–4

<div id="21_January_2008"> </div id>

21 January 2008 (Monday)
 Association football: 2008 Africa Cup of Nations:
Group A:  1 – 5 
Group B:  0 – 1 
Group B:  1 – 0 
Cricket
Zimbabwean cricket team in Pakistan in 2007–08
1st ODI- 347/5 (50 overs) beat  243/7 (50 overs) by 104 runs
Tennis: 2008 Australian Open
Men's singles – fourth round
 Roger Federer [1] def.  Tomáš Berdych [13], 6–4, 7–67, 6–3
 James Blake [12] def.  Marin Čilić, 6–3, 6–4, 6–4
 Novak Djokovic [3] def.  Lleyton Hewitt [19], 7–5, 6–3, 6–3
 David Ferrer [5] def.  Juan Carlos Ferrero [22], 7–5, 3–6, 6–4, 6–1
Women's singles – fourth round
 Venus Williams [8] def.  Marta Domachowska [Q], 6–4, 6–4
 Ana Ivanovic [4] def.  Caroline Wozniacki, 6–1, 7–62
 Daniela Hantuchová [9] def.  Maria Kirilenko [27], 1–6, 6–4, 6–4
 Agnieszka Radwańska [29] def.  Nadia Petrova [14], 1–6, 7–5, 6–0

<div id="20_January_2008"> </div id>

20 January 2008 (Sunday)

 American football:
 NFL Playoffs: Conference championship games
 New England Patriots 21, San Diego Chargers 12
The Patriots become the first NFL team to start a season 18–0–0, including the playoffs. Tom Brady throws three interceptions, keeping the game close. But the ball-control running of Laurence Maroney (who tallies 122 yards and a touchdown) and a tough New England defense ensure the Patriots keep the ball for nearly 22 minutes of the second half. The Chargers get only nine points out of four red-zone possessions on offense.
 New York Giants 23 Green Bay Packers 20 (OT)
Giants placekicker Lawrence Tynes misses two attempts at a game-winning field goal in the fourth quarter. Green Bay wins the toss in overtime, but Corey Webster intercepts Brett Favre, giving Tynes another shot. His 47-yard kick is good, sending the Giants to their first Super Bowl in seven years. Plaxico Burress records 11 catches for 154 yards. Favre throws two touchdown passes, one a 90-yarder to Donald Driver, but Ryan Grant is held to 29 yards. The Super Bowl will be a rematch of the Giants-Patriots battle from the last week of the regular season.
 Association football: 2008 Africa Cup of Nations:
Group A:  2 – 1 
Sulley Muntari gets the three-week Africa Cup of Nations off to a great start for hosts Ghana, scoring a 90th minute screamer.
Cricket:
West Indian cricket team in South Africa in 2007–08
1st ODI- 176/4 (34 overs) beat  175 (35.5 overs) by 6 wickets
Rugby union: 2007–08 Heineken Cup pool stage, Round 6
 In Pool 2,  Gloucester win the pool and earn a home quarterfinal with a 29–21 home win over (Ireland) Ulster. (European Rugby Cup)
 Also in Pool 2,  Ospreys secure the other second-place quarterfinal berth with a 28–21 away win over  Bourgoin. (European Rugby Cup)
 In Pool 3, the last quarterfinal berth is decided when the  Cardiff Blues shut out homestanding  Bristol 17–0. The Blues, however, fall one converted try short of securing a home quarterfinal, which instead goes to  Toulouse. (European Rugby Cup)
<div id="19_January_2008"> </div id>

Tennis: 2008 Australian Open
Men's singles – third round
 David Ferrer [5] def.  Vincent Spadea, 6–3 6–3 6–2
 Juan Carlos Ferrero [22] def.  David Nalbandian [10], 6–1, 6–2, 6–3
Men's singles – fourth round
 Rafael Nadal [2] def.  Paul-Henri Mathieu [23], 6–4, 3–0 ret.
 Mikhail Youzhny [14] def.  Nikolay Davydenko [4], 7–62, 6–3, 6–1
 Jo-Wilfried Tsonga def.  Richard Gasquet [8], 6–2, 6–75, 7–66, 6–3
 Jarkko Nieminen [24] def.  Philipp Kohlschreiber [29], 3–6 7–67 7–69, 6–3
Women's singles – third round
 Daniela Hantuchová [9] def.  Virginia Ruano Pascual, 6–2, 6–3
 Nadia Petrova [14] def.  Ekaterina Makarova, 6–1, 7–68
 Marta Domachowska [Q] def.  Li Na [24], 2–6, 6–2, 6–4
 Caroline Wozniacki def.  Sabine Lisicki [Q], 4–6, 6–4, 6–3
Women's singles – fourth round
 Justine Henin [1] def.  Hsieh Su-wei [Q], 6–2, 6–2
 Jelena Janković [3] def.  Casey Dellacqua, 7–63, 6–1
 Maria Sharapova [5] def.  Elena Dementieva [11], 6–0, 6–2
 Serena Williams [7] def.  Nicole Vaidišová [12], 6–3, 6–4

19 January 2008 (Saturday)

Rugby union: 2007–08 Heineken Cup pool stage, Round 6
 In Pool 1,  London Irish win the pool and earn a home quarterfinal with a 24–11 away win over  Benetton Treviso. (European Rugby Cup)
 Also in Pool 1,  Perpignan secure a quarterfinal berth as one of the two top second-place finishers, shutting out  Newport Gwent Dragons 25–0 in Newport. (European Rugby Cup)
 In Pool 5, (Ireland) Munster, in their "Fortress Thomond", ensure that there will be a new Cup holder in 2008, eliminating the current holders  London Wasps 19–3. (European Rugby Cup)
  Toulouse win Pool 6 in style, picking up a four-try bonus point in a 34–10 home win over  Edinburgh. (European Rugby Cup)
Cricket:
Indian cricket team in Australia in 2007–08
3rd Test- 330 & 294 beat  212 & 340 by 72 runs
 ends 's winning streak to prevent them from getting a world-record 17th consecutive win.
U.S. college basketball:
 Top-ranked North Carolina, off to its best start in over 20 years and an 18-point home favorite, falls from the unbeaten ranks 82–80 to Maryland. (AP via ESPN)
<div id="18_January_2008"> </div id>

18 January 2008 (Friday)

Rugby union: 2007–08 Heineken Cup pool stage, Round 6
 In Pool 4,  Saracens become the first team to advance to the quarterfinals, defeating  Glasgow Warriors 21–17 in Glasgow. The win also assures Saracens a home quarterfinal. (European Rugby Cup)
<div id="17_January_2008"> </div id>

17 January 2008 (Thursday)
Basketball: Euroleague
One club (in bold) secures a spot in the Top 16 phase:
In Group B, the 81–76 win of already-qualified  Maccabi Tel Aviv over  Cibona in Zagreb sends  Aris Thessaloniki through. (Euroleague)

<div id="16_January_2008"> </div id>

16 January 2008 (Wednesday)
Basketball: Euroleague
One club (in bold) secures a spot in the Top 16 phase:
In Group B,  Efes Pilsen defeat already-qualified  Lietuvos Rytas Vilnius 90–84 at home. (Euroleague)

<div id="15_January_2008"> </div id>

15 January 2008 (Tuesday)
 Association football:
 The G-14 group of leading European football clubs announces that it will disband on 15 February, after both FIFA and UEFA agree to compensate clubs for releasing their players to join national squads for Euro 2008, the 2010 FIFA World Cup and Euro 2012. (ESPNsoccernet)
 College athletics:
 The National Collegiate Athletic Association, the largest governing body of college sports in the United States, will allow Canadian universities to join as Division II schools as of June 1, 2008. Canadian Interuniversity Sport, the governing body of university sports in Canada, has yet to respond as to whether Canadian universities who join the NCAA will still maintain membership in the CIS, though some Canadian schools are currently members of both CIS and the National Association of Intercollegiate Athletics. It is expected that the UBC Thunderbirds and Simon Fraser Clan will be among the first university teams to join the NCAA. (CIS via TSN)

<div id="14_January_2008"> </div id>

14 January 2008 (Monday)

Cricket:
Bangladesh cricket team in New Zealand in 2007–08
2nd Test:  393 (103.2 ov.) beat  143 (45.3 ov.) & 113/9 (47 ov.) by an innings and 137 runs
Tennis:
The 2008 Australian Open commences, with Serena Williams and Jelena Janković kicking off the event against Jarmila Gajdošová and Tamira Paszek respectively.

<div id="13_January_2008"> </div id>

13 January 2008 (Sunday)

 American football:
 NFL Playoffs Divisional Round Games
 San Diego Chargers 28, Indianapolis Colts 24
With Philip Rivers and LaDainian Tomlinson injured, backups Billy Volek and Michael Turner lead San Diego on the game-winning touchdown drive. Peyton Manning throws for 402 yards and three touchdowns in the loss. The now-former-defending Super Bowl champion Colts' loss assures the NFL of a new recipient of the Super Bowl's Vince Lombardi Trophy in 2008 (the 2003–2004 New England Patriots remain the last team with back-to-back world championships).
 New York Giants 21, Dallas Cowboys 17
After allowing 96 and 90-yard touchdown drives in the first half, the Giants defense solidifies in the second. R. W. McQuarters intercepts Tony Romo in the end zone to clinch the game. Amani Toomer catches two touchdown passes for New York.
 Association football:
 International club friendly at the Citrus Bowl, Orlando, Florida, United States
 C.D. Guadalajara 2 – 1 Deportivo Cali

<div id="12_January_2008"> </div id>

12 January 2008 (Saturday)

 American football:
 NFL Playoffs Divisional Round Games
 Green Bay Packers 42, Seattle Seahawks 20
 The Seahawks convert two early fumbles by Green Bay tailback Ryan Grant into touchdowns and take a 14–0 lead. But Grant comes back to rush for 201 yards and three touchdowns, while Brett Favre throws for three more scores. The Packers outgain Seattle on the ground, 235 yards to 22.
 New England Patriots 31, Jacksonville Jaguars 20
 Tom Brady sets an NFL passing-accuracy record by going 26-for-28 for 262 yards and three touchdowns.
Cricket:
West Indian cricket team in South Africa in 2007–08
3rd Test:  556/4 dec (120 ov.) beat  139 (34.3 ov.) & 317 (86.5 ov.) by an innings and 100 runs
 Association football: Premier League
 Manchester United 6 – 0 Newcastle United
 Cristiano Ronaldo scores a hat-trick, the first of his career, as the Red Devils go level in the league with Arsenal. He scores a free kick in the 49th minute, and also in the 70th and 88th minutes.
 U.S. college basketball:
 Two of the five previously unbeaten teams in Division I men's basketball go down:
 First, #13 Vanderbilt comes back from a 16-point deficit to force overtime against Kentucky in Lexington, but eventually goes down 79–73 in double overtime.
 Then, in a showdown of top-5 teams in Los Angeles, #5 UCLA beats #4 Washington State 81–74.

<div id="11_January_2008"> </div id>

11 January 2008 (Friday)

<div id="10_January_2008"> </div id>

10 January 2008 (Thursday)
Basketball:
Euroleague: Five clubs (in bold) secure spots in the Top 16 phase, and one (in bold italics) is eliminated from Top 16 contention.
 In Group A:
  Olympiacos defeat already-qualified group leaders  CSKA Moscow 71–67 at home. (Euroleague)
  Žalgiris defeat  Olimpija Ljubljana 83–74 in Ljubljana. This result also sends  TAU Cerámica through. (Euroleague)
 In Group B:
  Maccabi Tel Aviv punch their ticket with an 87–68 home win over already-qualified  Unicaja Málaga. (Euroleague)
  Efes Pilsen defeat  Le Mans 91–84 in overtime in Le Mans, making the hosts the first club to be eliminated from Top 16 contention. (Euroleague)
 In Group C:
  Real Madrid go through with an 80–72 away win over  Partizan Belgrade. (Euroleague)
NCAA Division I:
George Washington defeats Saint Louis 46–20. The 20 points registered by the Billikens are the lowest since the introduction of the shot clock to Men's basketball in the 1985–86 season.

<div id="9_January_2008"> </div id>

9 January 2008 (Wednesday)
Basketball: Euroleague
One club (in bold) secures a spot in the Top 16 phase:
In Group A,  Montepaschi Siena defeat  TAU Cerámica 83–71 at home. (Euroleague)

<div id="8_January_2008"> </div id>

8 January 2008 (Tuesday)
Baseball
Baseball Hall of Fame balloting, 2008: Former relief pitcher Rich "Goose" Gossage is elected to the Hall of Fame on his ninth try. The former New York Yankees star closer received 85.8 percent of the vote, and is the only player voted in for 2008.
<div id="7_January_2008"> </div id>

7 January 2008 (Monday)

American football:
NCAA Division I FBS bowl games:
BCS – National Championship Game in New Orleans: LSU 38, Ohio State 24
The Buckeyes scored 10 points to begin the game, but the Tigers responded with 31 unanswered points and never looked back.

<div id="6_January_2008"> </div id>

6 January 2008 (Sunday)

American football:
NCAA Division I FBS bowl games:
GMAC Bowl in Mobile: Tulsa 63, Bowling Green 7
The Golden Hurricane, behind an NCAA-record 14th consecutive 300-yard passing game from Paul Smith, blow out the Falcons and amass the biggest winning margin in bowl game history.
NFL Playoff Wild Card Games:
New York Giants 24, Tampa Bay Buccaneers 14
The Bucs commit three turnovers while the Giants don't turn the ball over at all, and Eli Manning throws for 185 yards and 2 touchdowns in his first career playoff win.
San Diego Chargers 17, Tennessee Titans 6
The Chargers score 17 unanswered points to win their first playoff game in 13 years.
Cricket:
Indian cricket team in Australia in 2007–08:
2nd Test:  463 (112.3 ov.) & 401/7 dec. (107 ov.) beat  532 (138.2 ov.) & 210 (70.5 ov.) by 122 runs
 Australia equal their all-time record of 16 consecutive Test wins amid controversy over dubious umpiring decisions and alleged racist sledging by Indian off-spinner Harbhajan Singh.

<div id="5_January_2008"> </div id>

5 January 2008 (Saturday)

American football:
NCAA Division I FBS bowl games:
International Bowl in Toronto: Rutgers 52, Ball State 30
 In what proved to be his last college game, Ray Rice runs for 280 yards and four touchdowns to lead the Scarlet Knights to their second straight bowl win.
NFL Playoff Wild Card Games:
Seattle Seahawks 35, Washington Redskins 14
Todd Collins throws two touchdown passes in 2:15 to give the Redskins a 14–13 lead. But Matt Hasselbeck responds with a 20-yard scoring strike to D.J. Hackett, then the Seahawks defense returns two Collins interceptions for touchdowns.
Jacksonville Jaguars 31, Pittsburgh Steelers 29
Ben Roethlisberger leads the Steelers back from a 28–10 deficit in the fourth quarter, but also throws three interceptions. A 32-yard run by David Garrard on fourth-and-1 leads to Josh Scobee's game-winning 25-yard field goal. A fumble by Roethlisberger in the closing minute delivers the victory for the Jaguars.
Cricket:
Bangladesh cricket team in New Zealand in 2007–08
1st Test:  357 (91 ov.) & 39/1 (8.1 ov.) beat  137 (46.1 ov.) & 254 (83.1 ov.) by 9 wickets
West Indian cricket team in South Africa in 2007–08
2nd Test:  321 (118.2 ov.) & 186/3 (35.2 ov.) beat  243 (92.0 ov.) & 262 (101.5 ov.) by 7 wickets

<div id="4_January_2008"> </div id>

4 January 2008 (Friday)

2008 Dakar Rally: Rally cancelled due to recent terrorist attacks against French tourists in Mauritania.
Tennis:
The International Tennis Federation imposes a two-year ban on Swiss star Martina Hingis after she tested positive for cocaine at Wimbledon in 2007. Hingis had previously announced her second retirement after reports of the positive test surfaced in November 2007. (AP via ESPN.com)

<div id="3_January_2008"> </div id>

3 January 2008 (Thursday)

American football:
NCAA Division I FBS bowl games
BCS – Orange Bowl in Miami Gardens, Florida: Kansas 24, Virginia Tech 21
Basketball: Euroleague
Two more clubs (in bold) secure spots in the Top 16 phase, each by defeating one of the two French sides in the competition:
In Group B,  Lietuvos Rytas crush  Le Mans 85–50 at home. (Euroleague)
 In Group C,  AXA FC Barcelona defeat  Roanne 89–79 in Clermont-Ferrand. (Euroleague)

<div id="2_January_2008"> </div id>

2 January 2008 (Wednesday)

American football:
NCAA Division I FBS bowl games:
BCS – Fiesta Bowl in Glendale, Arizona: (11) West Virginia 48, (3) Oklahoma 28
Behind interim head coach Bill Stewart, the Mountaineers rush for 350 yards and four touchdowns against one of the nation's best run defenses.
Basketball: Euroleague
Three clubs (in bold) are the first to clinch spots in the Top 16 phase:
In Group A,  CSKA Moscow defeat  Olimpija Ljubljana 74–57 at home. (Euroleague)
In Group B,  Unicaja Málaga defeat  Armani Jeans Milano 89–70, also at home. (Euroleague)
 In Group C,  Panathinaikos punch their ticket with a 67–66 home win over  Partizan Belgrade. (Euroleague)

<div id="1_January_2008"> </div id>

1 January 2008 (Tuesday)

Ice hockey:
NHL Winter Classic held at Ralph Wilson Stadium in Orchard Park, New York
Pittsburgh Penguins 2, Buffalo Sabres 1 (SO)
Sidney Crosby picks up and assist on a Colby Armstrong goal 21 seconds into the game and ends the game by scoring against Ryan Miller in the final attempt of the overtime shootout. Brian Campbell scores for the Sabres at 1:25 of the 2nd period. An NHL-record crowd of 71,217 turns out despite a steady snow.
American football:
NCAA Division I FBS bowl games:
Outback Bowl in Tampa: (16) Tennessee 21, (18) Wisconsin 17
Cotton Bowl Classic in Dallas: (7) Missouri 38, (25) Arkansas 7
Missouri running back Tony Temple sets Cotton Bowl Classic records with 281 rushing yards and four touchdowns.
Gator Bowl in Jacksonville: Texas Tech 31, (21) Virginia 28
Capital One Bowl in Orlando: Michigan 41, (9) Florida 35
Michigan quarterback Chad Henne throws for 373 yards and three touchdowns in Lloyd Carr's last game as Wolverines head coach.
BCS – Rose Bowl in Pasadena: (6) USC 49, (13) Illinois 17
BCS – Sugar Bowl in New Orleans: (4) Georgia 41, (10) Hawaii 10
The Bulldogs' defense records eight sacks and five takeaways against the formerly undefeated Warriors.

01